Souhila Mallem (born 13 June 1988), often known as Bibicha, is an Algerian actress.

Personal life
She was born on 13 June 1988 in Algiers, Algeria. She studied law at the Faculty of Law of Algiers 1 University.

Career
In 2010, she hosted a program sponsored by the 'Cevital group' to support the Algerian national team which broadcast on the national channel ENTV. During the show, she was spotted by the director Djafar Gassem, and later offered the role in the television serial Djemai family 1 as 'Faty'. Then she starred in the serial Dar Bahdja as 'Zina'. 

However her most popular television acting came through the role of 'Bibicha' in the popular serial Bibiche and Bibicha. Later she acted as 'Princess Abla' in the serial Sultan Achour 10 and other roles as 'Sabrina' in serial El Khawa and role 'Lila' in the sitcom Wlad Hlal.

Filmography

References

External links
 

Living people
Algerian television actresses
Algerian actresses
1988 births
People from Algiers
21st-century Algerian people